ABC Radio Melbourne (official callsign: 3LO) is an ABC Local Radio station in Melbourne, Australia. It began transmission on 13 October 1924, and was Melbourne's second licensed radio station after 3AR.

Most Local Radio stations in Victoria simulcast ABC Radio Melbourne's programming when not airing local shows for their areas.

History
The station was initially owned by the Broadcasting Company of Australia, owned by J. & N. Tait (theatrical entrepreneurs), Buckley & Nunn (a department store) and The Herald and Weekly Times Ltd (a newspaper company). It was named after 2LO in England, where the LO probably stood for London. However, many radio historians believe the following alternative reason for the name: the first landline between the studio and transmitter did not work properly and, therefore, a second line was put into use, and someone with a sense of humour named the station 2LO, standing for Second Line Out.

The station began transmission with an outside broadcast of a performance of 'La Bohème' featuring Dame Nellie Melba, from His Majesty's Theatre.

The station initially operated on longwave on 174 kHz (1720 metres) using 5 watts from a site in what is today Maidstone (and was then considered Braybrook). In July 1925, it moved to the mediumwave 810 kHz.

From 1927 to 1939, the shortwave service "Voice of Australia" broadcast 3LO material to the world.

From 1928 the Postmaster-General's Department (PMG) was responsible for the technical side of all Australian A Class stations including 3LO. Also in 1928, the Australian Broadcasting Company was given a licence to provide all programming on 3LO. The Australian Broadcasting Company was nationalised and became the Australian Broadcasting Commission in 1932.

In 1938, transmission moved from Maidstone to Delahey (on a site then considered St Albans), where it remains today.

The two Melbourne stations (3LO & 3AR) had a studio in Melbourne Place, a laneway off Russell Street near Little Collins Street, until the building of Broadcast House in Lonsdale Street in 1945. The 3LO on-air studio at Broadcast House was studio 308, although for many years the news broadcasts came from Marland House in Bourke Street. The studios were transferred to the ABC's then new Southbank Centre in 1995.

In its early days the station was involved in programs, such as Kindergarten of the Air, giving children in regional areas greater social awareness and preparation for school.

In early 2006, with the start of the Melbourne 2006 Commonwealth Games, the ABC set up what was known as "The G-Spot" at Federation Square – an outside broadcast studio where members of the public could watch and participate in the broadcast. At the same time, ABC Radio Melbourne became the second Local Radio station to introduce streaming broadcasts in addition to its regular radio broadcast, subject to sporting rights and legal concerns.

Present
ABC Radio Melbourne provides a mix of local and national news, talkback, current affairs and sports programming. During part of the day it is also identified as ABC Radio Melbourne and ABC Victoria, as much of its content is also heard on other stations in the ABC Local Radio network in Victoria. It is also available through online streaming.

ABC Radio Melbourne's 774 kHz transmitter is located in Delahey, 20 km north-west of Melbourne's central business district. The station broadcasts at a power of 50,000 watts, covering the majority of Victoria, and one of two transmitters using the callsign 3LO, the other being at Marengo on 89.5 MHz with an EIRP of about 327 watts serving the Apollo Bay area.

ABC Radio Melbourne sometimes broadcasts live from events such as the Gardening Australia Expo, the Melbourne International Comedy Festival, the C31 Melbourne Antenna Awards, the Royal Melbourne Show and the Royal Geelong Show.

The station is housed in the ABC Southbank Centre, which has four levels incorporating ABC Local Radio, ABC Radio National, ABC Classic FM, Triple J, ABC Dig Music, Radio Australia, Australia Network, ABC News and Current Affairs and ABC TV.

ABC Radio Melbourne is an official Emergency Services Broadcaster, a role it notably filled during the Black Saturday bushfires and recovery in 2009.

Former presenters

 Mary Adams
 Doug Aiton
 Elizabeth Bond
 Clare Bowditch
 Alan Brough
 Lindy Burns
 Peter Clarke
 Peter Evans
 Jon Faine
 Libbi Gorr
 Derek Guille
 Lynne Haultain
 Gael Jennings
 Ramona Koval
 Terry Laidler
 Terry Lane
 Helen Razer
 Tonya Roberts
 Michael Schildberger
 Mark Skurnik
 Alan Stokes
 Richard Stubbs
 Red Symons
 Kevin Arnett

See also
 List of radio stations in Australia
 Timeline of Australian radio

References

External links
 ABC Radio Melbourne website
 ACMA 3LO Assignment
 Crossbandradio.com; Peter Evans broadcasts from the 1970s

Melbourne
Radio stations established in 1924
Radio stations in Melbourne